Marco Crespi (born 5 November 1978) is an Italian professional golfer.

Career
Crespi was born in Monza, Italy. He turned professional in 2002.

Crespi played on the Challenge Tour in 2006–2009 and 2012–2013. He was invited to the 2012 Telenet Trophy which he won to earn full membership of the Challenge Tour.  He subsequently won the 2013 Mugello Tuscany Open.

Crespi earned his 2014 European Tour card via qualifying school on his 11th attempt. He also earned his first European Tour win at the NH Collection Open and is the oldest rookie to win in European Tour history. By 2016, Crespi lost his European Tour card and was playing on the third tier Alps Tour, where he won in 2017.

Professional wins (11)

European Tour wins (1)

1Dual-ranking event with the Challenge Tour

Challenge Tour wins (3)

1Dual-ranking event with the European Tour

Alps Tour wins (6)

Other wins (2)
2005 Italian PGA Championship
2007 Italian PGA Championship

See also
2013 European Tour Qualifying School graduates

References

External links

Italian male golfers
European Tour golfers
Sportspeople from Monza
1978 births
Living people